Baudelaire most commonly refers to Charles Baudelaire (1821–1867), French poet.

Baudelaire may also refer to:
Baudelaire (surname)
Baudelaire, a 1947 book-length essay on Charles Baudelaire by Jean-Paul Sartre
Tyler, the Creator, American Rapper who also goes by the pseudonym Tyler Baudelaire
Baudelaires, a fictional family in A Series of Unfortunate Events
The Baudelaire Fractal, a 2020 novel by Lisa Robertson
The Baudelaire Label, Canadian record label
"Baudelaire", a song from the 2002 album Source Tags & Codes by ...And You Will Know Us by the Trail of Dead
An alternative spelling of Baselard, a type of late medieval dagger or knife